Eboshi-dake (Japanese , 'Eboshi peak', with Eboshi being a Japanese hat) is the name of several mountain peaks in Japan:

 Eboshi-dake (Akaishi-Gebirge), 2726m
 Eboshi-dake (Amakusa, Kumamoto), 170m
 Eboshi-dake (Amami-Ōshima), 364m
 Eboshi-dake (Aomori), 720m
 Eboshi-dake (Ashibetsu, Hokkaidō), 758m
 Eboshi-dake (Bungo-Ōno, Ōita), 821m
 Eboshi-dake (Echigo-Gebirge), 998m
 Eboshi-dake (Edakute-jima), 322m
 Eboshi-dake (Fujikawaguchiko, Yamanashi), 1257m
 Eboshi-dake (Gunma), 1182m
 Eboshi-dake (Hida-Gebirge), 2628m
 Eboshi-dake (Hida-Hochland), 1625m
 Eboshi-dake (Hokuto, Yamanashi), 2594m
 Eboshi-dake (Ibusuki/Minamikyūshū, Kagoshima), 363m
 Eboshi-dake (Iide-Bergland), 2018m
 Eboshi-dake (Imari, Saga), 596m
 Eboshi-dake (Isahaya, Nagasaki), 697m
 Eboshi-dake (Itoigawa, Niigata), 1451m
 Eboshi-dake (Iwakuni/Shūnan, Yamaguchi), 697m
 Eboshi-dake (Kadogawa, Miyazaki), 260m
 Eboshi-dake (Kagoshima, Kagoshima), 564m
 Eboshi-dake (Kamikawa, Hokkaidō), 2072m
 Eboshi-dake (Kirishima/Aira, Kagoshima), 703m
 Eboshi-dake (Kirishima, Kagoshima), 988m
 Eboshi-dake (Kiso/Asahi, Nagano), 1952m
 Eboshi-dake (Kiso-Gebirge), 2194m
 Eboshi-dake (Kuchinoshima), 234m
 Eboshi-dake (Kudamatsu/Shūnan, Yamaguchi), 412m
 Eboshi-dake (Minamiaizu, Fukushima), 1095m
 Eboshi-dake (Minamiaso, Kumamoto), 1337m
 Eboshi-dake (Mine, Yamaguchi), 395m
 Eboshi-dake (Murakami, Niigata), 489m
 Eboshi-dake (Nagasaki/Togitsu, Nagasaki), 413m
 Eboshi-dake (Nobeoka/Kadogawa, Miyazaki), 362m
 Eboshi-dake (Ōtate, Akita), 1133m
 Eboshi-dake (Saga, Saga), 281m
 Eboshi-dake (Saiki, Ōita), 641m
 Eboshi-dake (Saito/Nishimera, Miyazaki), 1126m
 Eboshi-dake (Sanjō, Niigata), 680m
 Eboshi-dake (Sapporo, Hokkaidō), 1109m
 Eboshi-dake (Sasebo, Nagasaki), 568m
 Eboshi-dake (Semboku, Akita), 1060m
 Eboshi-dake (Shūnan, Yamaguchi), 669m
 Eboshi-dake (Suzuka-Gebirge), 865m
 Eboshi-dake (Takachiho, Miyazaki), 809m
 Eboshi-dake (Taketa/Bungo-Ōno, Ōita), 731m
 Eboshi-dake (Tarumizu, Kagoshima), 390m
 Eboshi-dake (Tsushima, Nagasaki), 176m
 Eboshi-dake (Ueda/Tōmi, Nagano), 2066m
 Eboshi-dake (Yakushima), 1614m
 Eboshi-dake (Yamanouchi, Nagano), 2230m
 Eboshi-dake (Yatsushiro, Kumamoto), 1692m
 Eboshi-dake (Yufu, Ōita), 761m

See also
Eboshi-yama (disambiguation)

Mountains of Japan